The Malayan tiger is a tiger from a specific population of the Panthera tigris tigris subspecies that is native to Peninsular Malaysia. This population inhabits the southern and central parts of the Malay Peninsula and has been classified as critically endangered on the IUCN Red List since 2015. , the population was estimated at 80 to 120 mature individuals with a continuous declining trend.

In the Malay language, the tiger is called harimau, also abbreviated to rimau. It is also known as the southern Indochinese tiger, to distinguish it from tiger populations in northern parts of Indochina, which are genetically different to this population.

Taxonomy 
Felis tigris was the scientific name used by Carl Linnaeus in 1758 for the tiger.
Panthera tigris corbetti was proposed by Vratislav Mazák in 1968 for the tiger subspecies in Southeast Asia. Panthera tigris jacksoni was proposed in 2004 as a subspecies as a genetic analysis indicated differences in mtDNA and micro-satellite sequences to P. t. corbetti. Since revision of felid taxonomy in 2017, the Malayan tiger is recognised as a P. t. tigris population. However, a genetic study published in 2018 supported six monophyletic clades based on whole-genome sequencing analysis of 32 specimens. The Malayan tiger appeared to be distinct from other mainland Asian tiger specimens, thus supporting the concept of six subspecies.

Naming 
When the tiger population of the Malay Peninsula was accepted as a distinct subspecies in 2004, the chairman of the Malaysian Association of Zoos, Parks and Aquaria argued that the new subspecies should be named Panthera tigris malayensis to reflect the geographical region of its range. As a compromise, it received the vernacular name "Malayan tiger", and the scientific name jacksoni, which honours the tiger conservationist Peter Jackson. Nevertheless, P. t. malayensis was used by other authors.

Characteristics 

There is no clear difference between the Malayan and the Indochinese tigers, when specimens from the two regions are compared cranially or in pelage. No type specimen was designated. Malayan tigers appear to be smaller than Bengal tigers.

Distribution and habitat 
The geographic division between Malayan and Indochinese tigers is unclear as tiger populations in northern Malaysia are contiguous with those in southern Thailand.

Tigers abounded on Singapore Island in the 1830s when it was still a dense jungle and were also seen crossing the Strait of Johor. The first fatal attack of a tiger on a human was reported in 1831. Tiger hunting became a sport in those years. The expansion of plantations on Singapore Island led to more encounters between humans and tigers; daily tiger attacks were reported in the late 1840s. Local authorities organized tiger bounties, and the tiger population in Singapore decreased significantly. Tigers were extirpated on Singapore Island by the 1950s, and the last one was shot in 1932.

In Malaysia, tiger signs were reported in early-succession vegetation fields between 1991 and 2003, agricultural areas outside forests in Kelantan, Terengganu, Pahang, and Johor, and many riparian habitats outside forests in Pahang, Perak, Kelantan, Terengganu, and Johor. Most of the major rivers that drain into the South China Sea had some evidence of tigers, whereas those draining into the Strait of Malacca in the west did not.

In September 2014, two conservation organisations announced that camera trap surveys in seven sites in three separate habitats from 2010 to 2013 had produced an estimate of the surviving population of 250–340 individuals, with a few additional isolated small pockets probable. The decline meant that the population might have to be moved to the "Critically Endangered" category in the IUCN Red List. As of 2019, poaching and depletion of prey has caused the tiger population in Belum-Temengor Forest Reserve to decline about 60% over a period of 7–8 years, from approximately 60 to 23.

Ecology and behaviour 

Malayan tigers prey on sambar deer, barking deer, wild boar, Bornean bearded pigs and serow. Malayan tigers also prey on sun bears, young elephants and rhinoceros calves. Whether their principal prey includes adult gaur and tapir is unknown. Occasionally, livestock is also taken; however, tiger predation reduces the numbers of wild boar which can become a serious pest in plantations and other croplands. Studies indicate that in areas where large predators (tigers and leopards) are extinct, wild pigs are over 10 times more numerous than in areas where tigers and leopards are still present.

Information on dietary preference, morphological measurements, demographic parameters, social structure, communication, home range sizes, dispersal capabilities are all lacking.

Threats 
Habitat fragmentation because of development projects and agriculture is a serious threat. Between 1988 and 2012, an area of about  natural forest was lost in Peninsular Malaysia. Nearly  was converted to large-scale industrial plantations, primarily for palm oil production. An area of around  constituted prime tiger habitat.

Commercial poaching occurs at varying levels in all tiger range states. In Malaysia there is a substantial domestic market in recent years for tiger meat and manufactured tiger bone medicines. Between 2001 and 2012, body parts from at least 100 tigers were confiscated in Malaysia. In 2008, police found 19 frozen tiger cubs in a zoo. In 2012, skins and bones of 22 tigers were seized. The demand for tiger body parts used in Chinese traditional medicine apparently also attracts poachers from Vietnam, Thailand and Cambodia. Between 2014 and 2019, anti-poaching units removed around 1,400 snares from protected areas.

Conservation 

The tiger is included on CITES Appendix I, banning international trade. All tiger range states and countries with consumer markets have banned domestic trade as well. The Malaysian Conservation Alliance for Tigers (MYCAT) is "an alliance of non-governmental organisations comprising the Malaysian Nature Society (MNS), Traffic Southeast Asia, Wildlife Conservation Society-Malaysia Programme and WWF-Malaysia." It also includes the Department of Wildlife and National Parks. In 2007, they implemented a hotline to report tiger-related crimes, such as poaching.  In order to deter poaching, they organize "Cat Walks", a citizen patrol in danger zones. MYCAT has a goal of increasing the tiger population.

In November 2021, the Cabinet of Malaysia announced the initiation of nine conservation strategies (through 2030) to ensure the survival of the Malayan tiger; the strategies include enforcement of patrols, preservation and conservation of the Malayan tiger's natural habitat; establishment of a National Task Force for its conservation under the Department of Wildlife and National Parks Peninsular Malaysia's Tiger Conservation Unit; the wildlife crime bureau under the Royal Malaysia Police and the National Wildlife Forensics Laboratory were emboldened for its ex situ conservation, and provisions for a Malayan tiger habitat accreditation schemes enabled. The government also cooperates with zoos and universities in other countries to further research into inbreeding, and establishes a Malayan Tiger conservation centre to temporarily accommodate tigers before releasing them into the wild. The moratorium ban on deer hunting was extended further.

In captivity 
The Cincinnati Zoo was the first zoo in North America to begin a captive breeding program for Malayan tigers with the importation of a male and three females from Asia between 1990 and 1992. There are also a few Malayan tigers in Johor Zoo, Zoo Negara in Kuala Lumpur, and Taiping Zoo. As of 2011 there were 54 of this subspecies in North American zoos, located in 25 institutions and are descended from only 11 founders. Therefore, the plan of retaining a target of 90% genetic diversity over the next century is not possible unless other founders are added.

Cultural references 
The Malayan tiger is the national animal of Malaysia.
In Emilio Salgari's cycle of novels on the 19th century fictional pirate Sandokan, the protagonist is known as "The Tiger of Malaysia".

Two tigers are depicted as supporters in the coat of arms of Malaysia and the coat of arms of Johor. The coat of arms of Singapore features both a lion, being the namesake of the city-state, and a Malayan tiger, as a symbol of its cultural and historical ties to the Malay Peninsula. The tiger appears in various heraldry of Malaysian public institutions such as the Royal Malaysia Police and Football Association of Malaysia. The tiger symbolises bravery and strength among Malaysians. It is also the nickname for the Malaysia national football team. The tiger has been given various nicknames by Malaysians, notably "Pak Belang," which literally means "Uncle Stripes." Pak Belang features prominently in folklore as one of the adversaries of Sang Kancil (the mouse deer).
Within the private sector of the region, the tiger is also depicted within the iconic emblems of Maybank, Proton and Tiger Beer.

See also 

 Tiger populations
 Mainland Asian populations
 Bengal tiger
 Caspian tiger
 Indochinese tiger
 Siberian tiger
 South China tiger
 Sunda island populations
 Bali tiger
 Bornean tiger
 Javan tiger
 Sumatran tiger

 
 Holocene extinction

References

External links 

Mammals of Thailand
Carnivorans of Malaysia
Peninsular Malaysia
National symbols of Malaysia
Critically endangered fauna of Asia
Mammals described in 2004
Mammals of Malaysia
Malayan tiger